Major General Salvador Enrique Felices (August 13, 1923 – July 14, 1987) was the first Puerto Rican to reach the rank of major general in the United States Air Force. In 1957, he participated in "Operation Power Flite", the first round-the-world nonstop flight by a jet airplane.

Early years
Felices was born in the Santurce section of San Juan, Puerto Rico the capital city of island. There he received his primary and secondary education. After graduating from the Santurce Central High School, he enrolled in the University of Puerto Rico and joined its Air Force ROTC program.

West Point
In 1943, Felices was granted a congressional appointment to West Point, the U.S. Military Academy in New York. While he was a cadet at the academy, he undertook flying lessons at Curtis Field, Texas and Stewart Field in New York. On June 4, 1946, he was awarded his pilot wings and the following day he graduated from the academy and was commissioned as a second lieutenant.

Military service
On September 18, 1947, he became part of the newly formed branch of the armed forces, the United States Air Force. Felices received training in multi-engines and also completed the weapons training course. He was assigned in 1952, to the 303rd Bombardment Wing as the 359th Bombardment Squadron operations officer. Felices participated in a bombing competition, using a B-29 Superfortress equipped with an APQ-7 radar set and a Norden bombsight rate head. This eventually led to the development of the current techniques of synchronous radar bombing.

Korean War

In 1953, Felices flew 19 combat missions over North Korea, during the Korean War, as combat operations officer with the 344th Bombardment Squadron. In 1954, he was reassigned and stationed at Castle Air Force Base, California.  In 1955, Felices completed the instructor course for the B-52

In January 1957, he participated in a historic project which was given to Fifteenth Air Force by the Strategic Air Command headquarters known as "Operation Power-Flite". "Operation Power-Flite" was the first around the world flight by an all-jet aircraft. He later completed a course on the KC-135 aircraft at the Boeing Company Ground School and participated in its flight test program. He wrote the first flight curriculum and initial qualification requirements for future SAC pilots.

In July 1957, Felices delivered the first KC-135 to SAC Headquarters and was the first to pilot the initial flight of a KC-135 made by the then-Joint Chiefs of Staff. 

In 1958, he was awarded the Air Force Commendation Medal for landing a B-52 without the right rear landing gear.

Vietnam War
Felices held various positions within the military and rose in rank.  In June 1968, he was named commander of the 306th Bombardment Wing. He flew 39 combat bombing missions over North Vietnam during the Vietnam War in a B-52 aircraft.  In 1969, he became the commander of the 823d Air Division at McCoy Air Force Base, Florida, which covered SAC bases and operating locations in Florida, Puerto Rico, North Carolina and Georgia. In May 1970, Felices was named Assistant Deputy Chief of Staff at Headquarters, Strategic Air Command at Offutt Air Force Base, Nebraska. In this capacity, he was responsible for SAC's intercontinental ballistic missile operational testing programs.

Later years
Felices was promoted to the rank of major general on April 2, 1973, and in August of that year became the vice commander of Sixteenth Air Force, U.S. Air Forces in Europe at Torrejon Air Base, Spain.

Major General Salvador E. Felices retired from the United States Air Force on September 1, 1974. 

He died of natural causes on July 14, 1987, while vacationing in Vienna, Austria. He was buried with full military honors in the United States Air Force Academy Cemetery at Colorado Springs, Colorado. 

Felices was married to Shirley C. Gross with whom he had three children, Sherryl, Mark and Steven.

Awards and decorations
Among Felices' decorations and medals were the following:

Badges:
  Command pilot
  Missile Badge

Further reading

Puertorriquenos Who Served With Guts, Glory, and Honor. Fighting to Defend a Nation Not Completely Their Own, Greg Boudonck. ;

See also

List of Puerto Ricans
List of Puerto Rican military personnel
Hispanics in the United States Air Force

References

External links

1923 births
1987 deaths
Puerto Rican United States Air Force personnel
United States Air Force generals
Recipients of the Distinguished Flying Cross (United States)
United States Air Force personnel of the Korean War
United States Air Force personnel of the Vietnam War
American Korean War bomber pilots
American Vietnam War bomber pilots
Recipients of the Air Force Distinguished Service Medal
Recipients of the Air Medal
Recipients of the Legion of Merit
United States Military Academy alumni
People from San Juan, Puerto Rico
People from Santurce, Puerto Rico
Puerto Rican military officers